Cryptobacterium is a genus of Actinomycetota, in the family Coriobacteriaceae. Up to now there is only one species of this genus known (Cryptobacterium curtum).

References

External links
https://web.archive.org/web/20060212162102/http://www.bacterio.cict.fr/c/cryptobacterium.html

Further reading
 
 

Coriobacteriaceae
Monotypic bacteria genera
Bacteria genera